Preston Marshes is a  biological Site of Special Scientific Interest east of Canterbury in Kent.

This site in the valley of the River Little Stour is dominated by common reed, with areas of willow scrub and pasture. There are many breeding and wintering birds, such as reed buntings and sedge warblers.

A public footpath runs along the eastern boundary.

References

Sites of Special Scientific Interest in Kent